Arthur J. Jelinek  (July 19, 1928 – January 10, 2022) was an American anthropologist specializing in the Eurasian paleolithic.

Early years
Jelinek was born in Chicago but grew up in a suburb, La Grange, attending Lyons Township High School.  After high school, he entered the U.S. Marines.

Education
Jelinek briefly attended the Colorado School of Mines before transferring to the University of New Mexico, from which he obtained a B.A. degree in 1952.  In 1960, he got his Ph.D. from the University of Michigan, studying under James Griffin.  His dissertation was on an American archaeological topic, An Archaeological Survey of the Middle Pecos River Valley and the Adjacent Llanos Estacado.

Professional career
Jelinek taught at Beloit College, the University of Chicago, and the University of Michigan.  His final years were spent at the University of Arizona, where he was a professor and professor emeritus.  Although primarily an expert in the Old World Paleolithic, Jelinek also maintained a research interest in North American archaeology.

Honors
  University of Arizona Department of Anthropology Raymond H. Thompson Award for Distinguished Service to Anthropology.

Selected publications
 "‘Fire at will’: The Emergence of Habitual Fire Use 350,000 Years Ago,"
Journal of Human Evolution 77:196-203 (2014). (co-author)  DOI:10.1016/j.jhevol.2014.07.005
 Neandertal Lithic Industries at La Quina (2013, University of Arizona Press)
 "The Lower Paleolithic: Current Evidence and Interpretations," Annual Review of Anthropology6(1):11-32 (2003). DOI:10.1146/annurev.an.06.100177.000303

Additional material
 Interview: https://www.youtube.com/watch? (Part 1) and v=BMMdKw3qMZw https://www.youtube.com/watch?v=23yQIPGfDiU (Part 2)
 Obituary:  https://www.paleoanthropology.org/ojs/index.php/paleo/article/view/107/89

References

1928 births
2022 deaths
American people of Czech descent
University of New Mexico alumni
University of Michigan alumni
Beloit College faculty
University of Chicago faculty
University of Michigan faculty
University of Arizona faculty
20th-century American anthropologists
People from Chicago